Lechouri is a mountain village and a community in the municipal unit of Aroania, Achaea, Greece. In 2011, it had a population of 209 for the village and 288 for the community, which includes the villages Kerasia and Selli. The village is situated at about 1,000 m above sea level, near the mountain Kallifoni, which is part of the Erymanthos range. It is 4 km northeast of Livartzi, 6 km south of Ano Vlasia, 4 km northwest of Kamenianoi and 18 km southwest of Kalavryta.

Population

History
Historian G. Poretsano has two theories about the origin of the name Lechouri. The first is the Homeric word "ουρέα" which means "mountain peaks" and the second is the Cretan word "λέσκες" which means "ridges".

Roman villas and cemeteries have been found in the region. Lechouri was the crossroads of mountain trails leading to Patras by Vlasia and Chalandritsa. Many fighters in the 1821 Greek War of Independence came from Lechouri. Imvraim Arnaoutoglou, the Turkish commander of Kalavryta, was imprisoned in the village tower after the liberation of the town. This tower, also known as Lechouritis Tower, has been converted into a museum. Another important monument of the past is the small 16th century monastery of St George. To Lechouri now kept alive with rich events Association of Athens and Patras.

See also

List of settlements in Achaea

External links
Lechouri at the GTP Travel Pages
Lechouri-News

References

Aroania
Populated places in Achaea